The Standard Thai Astrology Manual by Luang Wisandarunkon (Lang) consist of 153 Holy Books of prophecy. Lang claimed that the writing was done between 1923 and 1937 AD. The narrative texts show practical criticism throughout the ritual, calculated based on mathematical and traditional inference, including observations.

References

Astrological texts
Thai culture